"Oh Very Young" is a song composed by Cat Stevens. It was released on his 1974 album Buddha and the Chocolate Box, as well as several later "Best of..." and "Greatest Hits" albums.  The song reached number 10 on the U.S. Billboard Hot 100 and number two Easy Listening.

Background
On his website djallyn.org, DJ Ally posted the following about "Oh Very Young" on April 30, 2009:

Chart performance

Cover versions
Suzanne Lynch worked as a session musician until she became a regular part of Cat Stevens' vocal group and appeared on several of his albums.  The first song Lynch did for Stevens was "Oh Very Young" in which she sang the solo line and the haunting background melody.
Jonathan Rayson also covered the song on his 2006 album "Shiny and New".

References 

1974 songs
Cat Stevens songs
Songs written by Cat Stevens
1974 singles
Island Records singles
A&M Records singles
Song recordings produced by Paul Samwell-Smith